A klomp (plural klompen) is a whole-foot clog from the Netherlands. Along with tulips and windmills, they are strongly associated with the country and are considered to be a national symbol of the Netherlands.

Usage
Approximately three million pairs of klompen are made each year. They are sold throughout the Netherlands. A large part of the market is for tourist souvenirs, though some Dutch people, particularly farmers and market gardeners, still wear them for everyday use. Outside the tourist industry, klompen can be found in local tool shops, local tourist shops and garden centers. 

The traditional all-wooden Dutch clogs have been officially accredited as safety shoes with the CE mark and can withstand almost any penetration including sharp objects and concentrated acids. They are actually safer than steel-capped protective shoes in some circumstances, as the wood cracks rather than dents in extreme accidents, allowing easy removal of the clog and not continued pressure on the toes by the (edge of the) steel nose.

Manufacture

Klompen can be made from willow or poplar.

See also 
 Bata Shoe Museum, Canada
 International Wooden Shoe Museum Eelde, Netherlands
 Klompendansen

Notes

References 
 'Dutch Heritage. Wooden Shoes', archived from: http://www.dutchdna2011.com/en/Homepage/Dutch-Heritage/Culture/Wooden-Shoes.htm 
 Wiedijk, F., Wooden Shoes of Holland (2000)

External links 
 Netherlands Association of Clogmakers (NVK)

Clogs (shoes)